Ibrahimzai are a subgroup of the Gandapur tribe living in Kulachi Dera Ismail Khan. They reside in Kulachi town and Maddi and Looni villages. Naurang Khan was a famous Ibrahimzai in the 19th century. He was awarded a jagir by British Empire in Bannu District for his help in Multan in 1857. Tehsil Sarai Naurang bears his name to this date. 

Gandapur Pashtun tribes
Pakistani names
Pashto-language surnames